Crown (stylized in all caps) is the second studio album by rapper and entertainer Aja, released independently on May 21, 2021.

Background and release

Crown follows the 2019 release of Aja's debut studio album Box Office, as well as their collaborative Halloween-themed extended play with rapper and producer Shilow, Nail in the Coffin. The album draws from their heritage and spiritual Lukumi faith and is also inspired by their experience in the COVID-19 pandemic which they say allowed them to "re-evaluate myself, my life, my story and how I want to deliver that". Aja has said that the more vulnerable moments on the album were inspired by Billie Eilish's discussion of mental health struggles on the song "Everything I Wanted". They say that each song was inspired by a specific orisha, or deity, and used "drums, cowbells" and "songs in the traditional tongue of the Lukumi faith" to construct them before they were sent to producers to craft the album's interludes. They also said that they wanted to separate themself from other RuPaul's Drag Race alumna in order to "not just perform the art, but be the art" and break from the "template for what people expect" from the show's former contestants. The 47-minute, twenty-track album was released in May 2021 following the release of three singles (alongside their associated interludes) over a span of two months.

Track listing

References

2021 albums
Aja (entertainer) albums